"Yellow Roses" is a song written by Ken Devine, performed by Hank Snow, and released on the RCA Victor label (catalog no. 20-6057). In April 1955, it peaked at No. 3 on Billboards country and western charts. It spent 27 weeks on the chart and was also ranked No. 9 on Billboards 1955 year-end country and western retail chart and No. 8 on the year-end juke box chart.

See also
 Billboard Top Country & Western Records of 1955

References

Hank Snow songs
1955 songs